Kelly AuCoin (born February 14, 1967) is an American actor who has appeared in film, television, and theater. He is best known as "Dollar" Bill Stern on Billions (Showtime), and Pastor Tim on The Americans (FX). He has had recurring roles on several other American television series, including The Girl from Plainville (Hulu), WeCrashed (AppleTV+), The Endgame (NBC), House of Cards (Netflix), and as Hercules Mulligan on the final season of Turn: Washington's Spies (AMC). He frequently appears on stage in New York and venues around the country, such as Manhattan Theatre Club, Signature Theatre, Playwrights Horizons, the Oregon Shakespeare Festival and La Jolla Playhouse. He has had supporting roles in many films, including Steven Spielberg's The Post, The Good House, False Positive, The Kingdom, Julie & Julia, and All That I Am, which won the SXSW Special Jury Award for Ensemble Acting.

Early life
AuCoin was born in the Portland suburb of Hillsboro, Oregon, the son of Les and Susan AuCoin, and grew up in Oregon and Washington, D.C., where his father served as a United States Congressman from 1975 to 1993. His first appearance on television was in one of his father's campaign commercials, in which he countered claims that his father was a tax-and-spend Democrat by washing the family car to illustrate how cheap his father actually was. AuCoin is a graduate of Georgetown Day School and Oberlin College.

Television
Upon arriving in New York, AuCoin landed small roles in several soap operas, including Guiding Light and The City. In the early 2000s, AuCoin appeared in episodes of The Sopranos and the first of many episodes of Law & Order. His breakthrough came in 2014, when he landed recurring roles in Netflix's House of Cards, The Americans, and, most importantly, as the rabidly loyal - and notoriously cheap - cult favorite, "Dollar" Bill Stearn, on the Showtime  series Billions. He has also appeared in other television series, such as The Bold Type, in which he played Jane Sloan's father during the show's final season, Madam Secretary, the NBC miniseries The Slap, Unforgettable, Person of Interest, Forever, The Following, Elementary, The Good Wife, White Collar, Gossip Girl, Blue Bloods, among others. He played the regular recurring role of Peter Keatch in the CBS series Waterfront, which was canceled before ever airing, despite having shot five episodes.

For the 2012 presidential election, NPR's Planet Money team cast AuCoin as their "Fake Presidential Candidate" to give voice to "major economic policies they could all stand behind."

Film
His first major film role came in 2007, where he played State Department official Ellis Leach in The Kingdom. In 2009's Julie & Julia, AuCoin played one of the executives for the Houghton Mifflin publishing company who declined to publish Julia Child's soon-to-be-legendary cookbook. More recently he has appeared in False Positive, starring and written by Iliana Glazer, Complete Unknown, starring Rachel Weisz, Barry Levinson's The Wizard of Lies, starring Robert De Niro, Drunk Parents, starring Alec Baldwin and Salma Hayek, and the upcoming The Good House, starring Sigourney Weaver and Kevin Kline.

Theatre
In 2005, AuCoin appeared as Octavius in a Broadway revival of Julius Caesar, which starred Denzel Washington. AuCoin has appeared in numerous other Off-Broadway stage productions, including Manhattan Theatre Club's productions of Of Good Stock and Long Lost, and Signature Theatre's 2014 revival of A. R. Gurney's The Wayside Motor Inn, directed by Lila Neugebauer, which won him, and the rest of the cast, a special Drama Desk Award for "Outstanding Ensemble". Other Off Broadway productions include 2008's premiere of Ernest Hemingway's The Fifth Column, 2009's Jailbait, by Deirdre O'Connor, directed by Suzanne Agins, 2010's Happy Now?, by Lucinda Coxon, the 2013 premiere of Tanya Barfield's The Call, directed by Leigh Silverman in a joint production by Primary Stages and Playwrights Horizons, He recently starred in two La Jolla Playhouse productions; J. T. Rogers' Blood And Gifts, directed by Lucie Tiberghien, and Arthur Kopit and Anton Dudley's world premier A Dram Of Drummhicit, directed by Christopher Ashley. AuCoin was a member of the Oregon Shakespeare Festival acting company in the early 1990s.

Personal life
AuCoin is married to dancer Carolyn Hall, winner of a 2002 Bessie Award for creative work in dance performance, and the couple lives in Brooklyn.

Filmography

References

External links

1967 births
American people of Acadian descent
American male film actors
American male television actors
Living people
People from Hillsboro, Oregon
Oberlin College alumni
Male actors from Washington, D.C.
Male actors from Oregon
20th-century American male actors
21st-century American male actors
Georgetown Day School alumni